The Cooperative Baptist Fellowship (CBF) is a Baptist Christian denomination in the United States. It is affiliated with the Baptist World Alliance. The headquarters is in Decatur, Georgia.

History 
The Cooperative Baptist Association has its origins in a meeting in Atlanta in 1990 of a group of moderate churches of the Southern Baptist Convention criticized the control of the direction of the convention by fundamentalists, as well as the opposition to the ordination of women. It was officially founded in 1991. As of 1996, the association had 1,400 churches and was still affiliated with the Southern Baptist Convention. In 1998, it began ordaining chaplains. In 2002, it officially left the Southern Baptist Convention and became a member of the Baptist World Alliance. According to a denomination census released in 2020, it claimed 1,800 churches and 750,000 members.

Beliefs 
The denomination has a Baptist confession of faith.

The Cooperative Baptist Fellowship, like the Southern Baptist Convention from which it split, does not enforce particular beliefs upon congregations, as is congruent with traditional Baptist theology. The Fellowship's "understanding of Baptist faith and practice is expressed by [their] emphasis on freedom in biblical interpretation and congregational governance, the participation of women and men in all aspects of church leadership and Christian ministry, and religious liberty for all people." CBF also ascribes to the "Four Fragile Freedoms" as developed in The Baptist Identity: Four Fragile Freedoms by Walter Shurden.  CBF interprets these freedoms as:
 Soul Freedom: We believe in the priesthood of all believers and affirm the freedom and responsibility of every person to relate directly to God without the imposition of creed or the control of clergy or government.
 Bible Freedom: We believe in the authority of Scripture.  We believe the Bible, under the Lordship of Christ, is central to the life of the individual and the church. We affirm the freedom and right of every Christian to interpret and apply scripture under the leadership of the Holy Spirit.
 Church Freedom: We believe in the autonomy of every local church. We believe Baptist churches are free, under the Lordship of Christ, to determine their membership and leadership, to order their worship and work, to ordain whomever they perceive as gifted for ministry, and to participate as they deem appropriate in the larger body of Christ.
 Religious Freedom: We believe in the freedom of religion, freedom for religion, and freedom from religion. We support the separation of church and state. 

Affirmation of women in ministry was one of the founding principles of the  Fellowship. Most CBF members agree that both men and women may be ordained as ministers or deacons and serve as pastors of churches. 

On social issues, the CBF does not issue position statements. CBF members agree that as it is a fellowship of autonomous churches, issuing statements would be beyond its purpose.  It does have an organizational policy on homosexual behaviour. However, CBF policies are not binding on individual congregations which make their own decisions regarding any issue; neither can a congregation be excluded from the CBF for disagreeing with core values or policies. In 2016, the CBF co-sponsored a conference on sexuality and initiated the "'Illumination Project' approved by the Governing Board (formerly the Coordinating Council) to develop models for the Fellowship community to air differences not only about the hiring ban but also other hot-button issues dividing churches, denominations and society". In 2018, the Affirming Network for full LGBTQ inclusion and affirmation was founded.

State and regional organizations 

There are CBF-affiliated churches in 43 out of the 50 states. Alongside the national CBF, there are 19 state and regional organizations that are affiliated with CBF and help provide churches with resources at a more local level

School
It has 1 affiliated theological institute, the Baptist Seminary of Kentucky in Lexington, Kentucky.

Controversies 
In 2018, the Kentucky Baptist Convention (Southern Baptist Convention) proceeded to excommunications of churches having a dual affiliation with the Cooperative Baptist Fellowship, due to a relaxation allowing hiring of non-executive LGBT staff.

References

External links  
 

Christian organizations established in 1991
Organizations based in Atlanta
Baptist denominations in the United States
Baptist denominations established in the 20th century
1991 establishments in Georgia (U.S. state)